This is a list of Scottish football transfers, featuring at least one 2017–18 Scottish Premiership club or one 2017–18 Scottish Championship club, which were completed during the summer 2017 transfer window. The window closed at midnight on 31 August 2017.

List

See also
 List of Scottish football transfers winter 2016–17
 List of Scottish football transfers winter 2017–18

References

Transfers
Scottish
2017 in Scottish sport
2017 summer